Deh-e Mokhtar (also Romanized as Deh-e Mokhtār; also known as Deh-e Āqā Mokhtārī and Mokhtār) is a village in Dust Mohammad Rural District, in the Central District of Hirmand County, Sistan and Baluchestan Province, Iran. At the 2006 census, its population was 403, in 69 families.

References 

Populated places in Hirmand County